Teen Beat is an American independent record label, originally based in Arlington, Virginia, now based in Cambridge, Massachusetts. It was founded by Mark Robinson (of Unrest) in 1984 at Wakefield High School, along with Phil Krauth (of Unrest), Andrew Beaujon (of Eggs), Tim Moran (of Unrest), and Ian Zack (Thirsty Boys).

History
In 1984, when Mark Robinson was in high school, he started the label as a kind of lending library. Only one copy of each album existed and his  classmates could borrow one for a few days. The albums were mostly unedited rehearsals of Robinson's band Unrest. They were not numbered but lettered (A, B, C, etc.). Only one of these early albums is known to still exist: Unrest's This Side, Numskull; catalogue number "J" (the 10th TeenBeat release); dated December 14, 1984.

The first public release was a compilation cassette called Extremism In the Defense of Liberty is No Vice on February 23, 1985. This was catalog number "TeenBeat 1". This audiocassette was dubbed into multiple copies by Andrew (Riley) Beaujon and Mark Robinson, by hooking up two separate cassette machines.

Robinson's original intention was to release music from the local area, inspired by Dischord Records. Before the label had any distribution deal Robinson would leave a few cassettes at records stores when he visited different cities.

Style
As with its influence Factory Records, Teen Beat prominently numbered its releases, with some releases known only by catalog number (e.g., the TEENBEAT 100 compilation, 1993); numbers have also been assigned to non-musical items, including T-shirts, coffee mugs, events, its offices, and interns.

List of Teen-Beat bands
Teen Beat (or "Teen-Beat" or "Teenbeat") has been home to a number of prominent indie bands, including Unrest, +/-, Versus, Gastr del Sol, Eggs, Aden, True Love Always and a large number of other bands and side projects.  Along with Dischord Records, TeenBeat was an important early independent label; while Dischord focused on punk and hardcore, TeenBeat's bands were more typically guitar-based "indie-pop". Both labels almost exclusively work with bands from the Washington, D.C. area.

 Aden
 Air Miami
 Autoclave
 The Ballet
 Bastro
 Andrew Beaujon
 Bells Of
 Blast Off Country Style
 Bloodthirsty Butchers
 Mark Borthwick/hollAnd
 Bossanova
 Bratmobile
 Bridget/Kathi/Doug
 Cath Carroll
 Justin Chearno
 Tha Cheeky Bastid
 Circus Lupus
 Clarence
 Cobalt
 Jonny Cohen
 Containe
 Cotton Candy
 Crispy Ambulance
 Currituck Co.
 Draw the Kitten
 Dustdevils
 DVS
 Eggs
 The Feminine Complex
 Flin Flon
 Flowers of Discipline
 Flying Saucer
 The Fontaine Toups/TFT
 Fred & Ginger
 Gastr del Sol
 Gene Ween
 The Gollipopps
 Grenadine
 Helter Skillet
 Kevin Hewick
 hollAnd
 horse ing two=HIT
 Hot Pursuit
 In Camera
 In Interview
 Jungle George & The Plague
 The Krokodiloes
 K-Stars
 Phil Krauth
 The Last Wave
 Latin Hustle
 The Long Goodbye
 Los Marauders
 Loudest Boom Bah Yea
 Lu
 Barbara Manning
 Mark E. Superstar
 Maybe It's Reno
 Mirah & Ginger
 MMM's Live Archive
 The Naysayer
 Nethers
 New Carrollton
 No Trend
 Olympic Death Squad
 The Pacific Ocean
 Panax
 +/- {Plus/Minus}
 Pocket Rockets
 The Positions
 Que Verde
 Rhonda Harris
 Rive Gauche
 Mark Robinson
 Romania
 The Rondelles
 The Ropers
 Scaley Andrew
 Robert Schipul/Ascension
 The Screamer
 S.C.U.D.
 Section 25
 Sexual Milkshake
 Sharky Favorite
 Tracy Shedd
 Sisterhood of Convoluted Thinkers
 Sprites
 Stereolab
 Stick Insect
 The Still
 Subject to Change
 Superconductor
 Synthetic Socks
 Juliet Swango
 Teenage Gang Debs
 Tel Aviv
 Thirsty Boys
 True Love Always
 The Tube Bar 
 Tuscadero
 Uncle Wiggly
 Unrest
 Velocity Girl
 Versus
 Viva Satellite!
 Volumia
 Vomit Launch
 Wall Drug
 Whysall Lane
 William & Vivian
 Butch Willis
 Naomi Wolff
 Jeff & Robert Zitofsky

See also
 List of independent record labels
 Teenbeat discography

References

External links
 TeenBeat Records

Record labels established in 1984
American independent record labels
Indie rock record labels
1984 establishments in Virginia